Marwa Hassani (born 15 September 2002) is a footballer who plays as a defender for Division 2 Féminine club VGA Saint-Maur. Born in France, she represents Morocco at international level.

Early life
Hassani was born in Tournan-en-Brie.

Club career
Hassani has played for Saint-Maur in France.

International career
Hassani made her senior debut for Morocco on 26 November 2020.

See also
List of Morocco women's international footballers

References

2002 births
Living people
Citizens of Morocco through descent
Moroccan women's footballers
Women's association football defenders
Morocco women's international footballers
People from Tournan-en-Brie
Footballers from Seine-et-Marne
French women's footballers
French sportspeople of Moroccan descent